Kiichi Harada is a Japanese Olympic Dressage rider. Representing Japan, he competed at the 2016 Summer Olympics in Rio de Janeiro where he finished 45th in the individual and 11th in the team competition.

Kiichi was born into the horse riding world, the oldest son of the owner of the Nishizao Horse Riding Club in Yamagata Prefecture. He started riding at age 6, motivated by the receipt of a pony as a birthday present. At age 17 he began training under Masayasu Sugitani, owner of the Sugitani Riding Club in Izumi City, Osaka. In 2000 he moved to Okayama in preparation for the 2005 National Sports Festival of Japan in Okayama, where he won both the Eventing and Dressage categories. Immediately after the successful competition he moved to Hiruzen, Okayama Prefecture, where in 2007 he became the President of the Maniwa City Hiruzen Kougen Riding Park, more commonly known as Hiruzen Horse Park. From 2005 to 2016 Kiichi had 143 tournament wins recognized by the Japan Equestrian Federation. In 2014 he started focusing solely on Dressage. His score in the individual Dressage competition at the 2016 Summer Olympics has thus far been the highest score ever attained by a Japanese rider at the Olympic Games.

Competition

Old Friends Japan
In April 2021 Kiichi spearheaded the foundation of Old Friends Japan, a retraining and retirement facility for off-track Thoroughbred racehorses in Hiruzen, Okayama. Old Friends Japan got its name from Old Friends Equine, an equine aftercare and retirement facility run by Mr. Michael Blowen  in Georgetown, Kentucky.

References

External links
 Hiruzen Horse Park
 Photos from 2016 Summer Olympics 
 Old Friends Japan

Living people
1972 births
Japanese male equestrians
Equestrians at the 2016 Summer Olympics
Olympic equestrians of Japan
Japanese dressage riders
Sportspeople from Yamagata Prefecture